Agasias was the name of several different people in classical history, including two different Greek sculptors.

 Agasias of Arcadia, a warrior mentioned by Xenophon
 Agasias, son of Dositheus, Ephesian sculptor of the Borghese Gladiator
 Agasias, son of Menophilus, Ephesian sculptor

Greek masculine given names